"The Gods of the Copybook Headings" is a poem by Rudyard Kipling, characterized by biographer Sir David Gilmour as one of several "ferocious post-war eruptions" of Kipling's souring sentiment concerning the state of Anglo-European society. It was first published in the Sunday Pictorial of London on 26 October 1919; in America, it was published as "The Gods of the Copybook Maxims" in Harper's Magazine in January 1920.

In the poem, Kipling's narrator counterposes the "Gods" of the title, who embody eternal truths, against "the Gods of the Market-Place", who represent an optimistic self-deception into which it supposes society has fallen in the early 20th century.

The "copybook headings" to which the title refers were proverbs or maxims, often drawn from sermons and scripture extolling virtue and wisdom, that were printed at the top of the pages of copybooks, special notebooks used by 19th-century British schoolchildren. The students had to copy the maxims repeatedly, by hand, down the page. The exercise was thought to serve simultaneously as a form of moral education and penmanship practice.

Modern critical interpretation 
Kipling's narrative voice contrasts the purported eternal wisdom of these commonplace texts with the fashionable and (in Kipling's view) naïve modern ideas of "the Market-Place",  making oblique reference, by way of puns or poetic references to older geological time periods, to Lloyd George and Liberal efforts at disarmament ("the Cambrian measures"), feminism ("the ... Feminian Sandstones"), and socialist policies advocated by trade-unionists, many of whom were coalminers ("the Carboniferous Epoch").

In a footnote to a philosophical essay, Francis Slade compared Kipling's theme to Horace's Epistles I.10 ("The Advantages of Country Life"), in which the Roman poet says:Drive Nature off with a pitchfork, she’ll still press back,
And secretly burst in triumph through your sad disdain.According to Slade, while the poem's verbosity is "far removed from Horace's elegant succinctness", it does "make the same point with some force".

John C. Bogle described the poem as "beautifully captur[ing] the thinking of Schumpeter and Keynes", who espoused, respectively, "entrepreneurship" and "animal spirits": both ideas of the market place.

T. S. Eliot included the poem in his 1941 collection A Choice of Kipling's Verse.

Poem

References

External links

 Gods of the Copybook Headings hosted at kipling.org.uk
 The Gods of the Copybook Headings by Rudyard Kipling, 1865–1936 (includes a reading in MP3 format)

Poetry by Rudyard Kipling
1919 poems